Santa Fé  is a corregimiento and town in Chepigana District, Darién Province, Panama with a population of 6,923 as of 2010. It was created by Law 58 of July 29, 1998, owing to the Declaration of Unconstitutionality of Law 1 of 1982. Its population as of 2000 was 5,764. It is approximately 200 km east of Panama City on the Inter-American Highway. The town contains a hospital. It is served by bus.

References

Corregimientos of Darién Province
Populated places in Darién Province